Linda Bakker (born 13 February 1993) is a Dutch professional footballer who plays as midfielder for Spanish Liga F club Valencia CF.

Club career
Bakker played youth team football for sc Dynamo, SVW '27 and VV Reiger Boys. In 2009–10 she represented the latter club in the Hoofdklasse, before moving on to AZ Alkmaar of the Eredivisie for 2010–11. In 2011 she spent time at Loyola Marymount University and played college soccer for the "Lions". She started all 20 of the team's matches in her freshman season and scored two goals.

In 2012 Bakker signed for AFC Ajax, who had formed to join the newly-constituted BeNe League. After two seasons she moved on to SC Telstar, where she spent three seasons. In 2017 Bakker returned to Ajax for her second spell with the club. She transferred to Valencia CF in July 2021.

International career

At youth level Bakker played six times for the Netherlands women's national under-17 football team, scoring one goal and 13 times for the Netherlands women's national under-19 football team, scoring five goals.

References

External links

Profile at La Liga
Profile at BDF Futbol

Living people
Dutch women's footballers
Eredivisie (women) players
1993 births
Footballers from North Holland
AFC Ajax (women) players
People from Koggenland
Dutch expatriate footballers
Expatriate women's footballers in Spain
Dutch expatriate sportspeople in Spain
Valencia CF Femenino players
AZ Alkmaar (women) players
Telstar (women's football club) players
Loyola Marymount Lions women's soccer players
Women's association football midfielders